Kit is a surname. Notable people with the surname include:

 Andriy Kit (born 1971), Ukrainian politician
 Barys Kit (1910–2018), Belarusian-American rocket scientist
 Daniel-Leon Kit (born 1998), American actor
 Kateryna Kit-Sadova (born 1974), Ukrainian art critic
 Kristen Kit (born 1988), Canadian athlete
 Tetyana Kit (born 1994), Ukrainian wrestler

See also
 

Ukrainian-language surnames